Godbout is a surname. Notable people with the surname include:

Adélard Godbout (1892–1956), agronomist and politician in Quebec, Canada
Alexis Godbout (1799–1887), merchant and political figure in Quebec
Bill Godbout (1939–2018), early computer pioneer and entrepreneur
Jacques Godbout, CQ (born 1933), Canadian novelist, essayist, children's writer, journalist, filmmaker and poet
Joseph Godbout (1850–1923), physician and political figure in Quebec
Marc Godbout (born 1951), the former Canadian Member of Parliament (MP) for the Ottawa—Orléans riding
Michel Godbout, Canadian television news anchor

See also
Godbout, Quebec, village in the Côte-Nord region of Quebec, Canada
Godbout v. Longueuil (City)